Tools of the Trade is an EP by British extreme metal band Carcass. It was released through Earache Records on 23 June 1992.

It contains re-recordings of two previously released Carcass songs; "Pyosisified (Rotten to the Gore)" from Reek of Putrefaction and "Hepatic Tissue Fermentation", which was originally released on a compilation titled Pathological.

Track listing

Other appearances
The EP is wholly contained on the compilation album Gods of Grind and the limited edition 2008 dualdisc reissue of Necroticism – Descanting the Insalubrious. It also appears on Wake up and Smell the... Carcass, but without the track "Incarnated Solvent Abuse".

Personnel
Michael Amott – guitar
Ken Owen – drums
Bill Steer – guitar, vocals
Jeff Walker – bass, vocals
Colin Richardson – production

References

Carcass (band) EPs
1991 EPs
Earache Records EPs